The 2006–07 Washington Huskies men's basketball team represented the University of Washington for the 2006–07 NCAA Division I men's basketball season. Led by fifth-year head coach Lorenzo Romar, the Huskies were members of the Pacific-10 Conference and played their home games on campus at Hec Edmundson Pavilion in 

Washington had only one road win in league play (over last place Arizona State), and ended the regular season with home wins over USC and second-ranked UCLA, the regular season 

At the conference tournament in Los Angeles, Washington defeated tenth seed Arizona State in the first round, but lost to rival Washington State by ten points in a quarterfinal; it was the fifth straight loss to

Postseason results

|-
!colspan=5 style=| Pacific-10 Tournament

References

External links
Sports Reference – Washington Huskies: 2006–07 basketball season

Washington Huskies men's basketball seasons
Washington Huskies
Washington
Washington